Gençler is a village in the Sason District, Batman Province, Turkey. The village is populated by Kurds and had a population of 247 in 2021.

References 

Villages in Sason District
Kurdish settlements in Batman Province